GN is the second studio album by American indie rock band Ratboys. The album was released on June 30, 2017.

Track listing
All songs written by Julia Steiner.

References

2017 albums
Ratboys albums
Topshelf Records albums